The Archive of Liberalism of the Friedrich Naumann Foundation for Freedom in Gummersbach, North Rhine-Westphalia has been in existence since 1968 and is thus the oldest of the six archives of political foundations in Germany.

Content 
The Archive of Liberalism collects documents on the history of organized liberalism. In addition to "classical" file material, it also catalogues printed matter, leaflets, posters and other advertising material, as well as photos, films, videos, audio tapes and digital media (including websites). The focus of the collections is on Germany and the period after 1945; a few individual holdings date from the Weimar Republic, very few from the late 19th century. In total, the holdings comprise some 4.9 linear kilometres of files (as of 2020) and some 25,000 units of audiovisual material (posters, films, advertising material). The archive also includes a specialist scientific library with about 42,000 volumes (books, journals, printed matter, articles). The vast majority of the holdings are indexed in a database as well as in analogue or digital finding aids and are made available to users - in compliance with the terms of protection under the Federal Archives Act.

People 
In addition, the archive holds the estates of liberal politicians, including former members of the Bundestag and federal chairmen of the FDP, such as those of the Federal Minister of the Interior and Foreign Affairs Hans-Dietrich Genscher, the Federal President and Federal Minister of Foreign Affairs Walter Scheel, the Federal Minister of Justice Thomas Dehler or the Federal Minister of Economics Otto Graf Lambsdorff, the long-standing chairman of the FDP parliamentary group Wolfgang Mischnick or the Vice-President of the German Bundestag Liselotte Funcke. 

Further holdings can be found in the archives by the following personalities, among others:

 Franz Blücher, Federal Minister for Marshall Plan Affairs and Federal Minister for Economic Cooperation
 Dieter-Julius Cronenberg, long-time Vice President of the German Bundestag
 Johannes Dieckmann, President of the People's Chamber of the GDR (LDPD)
 Martha Dönhoff, German women's rights activist and liberal politician (DDP, FDP)
 Josef Ertl, Federal Minister of Food, Agriculture and Forestry
 Karl-Hermann Flach, Federal Executive Director and General Secretary of the FDP
 Hildegard Hamm-Brücher, State Secretary, Member of the Bundestag, Minister of State at the Federal Foreign Office
 Wilhelm Külz, politician (DDP, LDP), Reich Minister of the Interior, 1945 to 1948 Chairman of the LDP
 Reinhold Maier, first prime minister of Baden-Württemberg
 Hermann Saam, German diplomat and mayor
 Cornelia Schmalz-Jacobsen, Senator in Berlin, Secretary General of the FDP, Federal Government Commissioner for Foreigners
 Guido Westerwelle, Federal Chairman of the FDP and Federal Foreign Minister

See also 
 Archive for Christian Democratic Policy

References

External links 

 Main website

History of liberalism
Archives in Germany
Photo archives in Germany
Free Democratic Party (Germany)
1968 establishments in Germany